State Road 60 in the U.S. State of Indiana is a mostly rural, two-lane highway in the southeastern portion of the state, covering a distance of about .

Route description

SR 60 begins at U.S. Route 50 east of Huron in southern Lawrence County and runs east towards Mitchell.  In Mitchell, SR 60 is concurrent with State Road 37.  After Mitchell SR 60 heads southeast toward Salem, passing through Campbellsburg.  In Salem SR 60 are concurrent with State Road 56 and State Road 135.  Southeast from downtown Salem SR 60 has an intersection with Indiana State Road 160.  SR 60 leaves Salem heading south-southeast towards Sellersburg, passing through New Pekin,  Borden, and Bennettsville.  In Sellersburg SR 60 passes over Interstate 65 (I-65), followed by an intersection at U.S. Route 31.

History 
Western section of SR 60 from US 50 to SR 37 was number State Road 250 until 1939.

Major intersections

References

External links

060
Transportation in Clark County, Indiana
Transportation in Lawrence County, Indiana
Transportation in Orange County, Indiana
Transportation in Washington County, Indiana